The Dr. Frizzell House is a historic house at the junction of United States Route 67 and Elm Street in Bradford, Arkansas.  It is a -story wood-frame structure, with a broad front-facing gable roof.  Its front facade has a group of three sash windows to the right, and a gable-roofed entry porch to the left, supported by Craftsman-style sloping square wooden columns mounted on stuccoed pedestals.  Built about 1929, it is a good local example of Craftsman architecture.

The house was listed on the National Register of Historic Places in 1992.

See also
National Register of Historic Places listings in White County, Arkansas

References

Houses on the National Register of Historic Places in Arkansas
Houses completed in 1929
Houses in White County, Arkansas
National Register of Historic Places in White County, Arkansas
1929 establishments in Arkansas
Bungalow architecture in Arkansas
American Craftsman architecture in Arkansas